Macmillan's Magazine was a monthly British magazine from 1859 to 1907 published by Alexander Macmillan.

The magazine was a literary periodical that published fiction and non-fiction works from primarily British authors. Thomas Hughes had convinced Macmillan to found the magazine. The first editor was David Masson.

In 1868, David Masson resigned as editor of Macmillan's Magazine and left London to become Professor of English Literature at Edinburgh University. Alexander Macmillan appointed George Grove, who remained in this post for 15 years, becoming also a general literary adviser to the publisher.

In its first decade of existence, Frederick Denison Maurice was a prolific contributor.

References

Further reading
)

External links
Complete issues of Macmillan's Magazine at Internet Archive.
Macmillan's Magazine, hathitrust.org

1859 establishments in the United Kingdom
1907 disestablishments in the United Kingdom
Defunct literary magazines published in the United Kingdom
Magazines disestablished in 1907
Magazines established in 1859
Monthly magazines published in the United Kingdom